Ethylmethylthiambutene (Emethibutin) is an opioid analgesic drug from the thiambutene family, around 1.3x the potency of morphine. It is under international control under Schedule I of the UN Single Convention On Narcotic Drugs 1961, presumably due to high abuse potential.
 
It is a Schedule I controlled substance in the United States with a DEA ACSCN of 9623 and zero annual manufacturing quota as of 2013.

References 

Synthetic opioids
Thiophenes
Amines
Mu-opioid receptor agonists